Simon Levy (also written Simon Lévy) (1934 – 2 December 2011) was a Moroccan Jewish activist, linguist, and anthropologist. Levy was the founder and secretary general of the foundation of Jewish-Moroccan cultural heritage, and the director of Casablanca’s Jewish Museum. He was also a leading figure in Morocco's communist party, and a critic of Israel.

Biography
Simon Levy was born in Fez into a family steeped in the traditional Moroccan Jewish culture. He began to advocate for Moroccan independence in his late teens, and in 1954 joined the Moroccan Workers’ Union, the National Moroccan Student Union, and the Moroccan Communist Party. During the student uprising in 1965 he was abducted and tortured for eight days.

After the suppression of the Moroccan Communist party in the mid-1960s, Levy continued his activism and work with the Party of Progress and Socialism (PPS), and began an academic career as a linguist at Mohammed V University in Rabat. Between 1976 and 1983 he served as an advisor to the Municipal Council of Casablanca. In that capacity, he worked to create local libraries and professional training centers. He edited and contributed to several Moroccan publications, including La Nation, Al Jamahir and Al Bayane. Since 1998 he served as the director of the Foundation for Moroccan Jewish Patrimony as well as Casablanca’s historical and ethnographic Museum of Moroccan Judaism.

Memory
In 2014, Mimouna Associations in Morocco decided to create an award in the name of Simon Levy, given to people who have been involved in the preservation of the Jewish Heritage and the promotion of this culture within the young generation, often involving a great deal of commitment on a very regular basis.

References

1934 births
2011 deaths
Moroccan activists
People from Fez, Morocco
20th-century Moroccan people
21st-century Moroccan people
20th-century Moroccan Jews
Jewish Moroccan politicians
Arab Jews
Jewish socialists
Moroccan communists
Jewish communists
Moroccan Jews